Women of Faith is a 2009 documentary by Rebecca M. Alvin, which examines women's decisions to lead religious lives in the Roman Catholic tradition in the post-feminist era. It asks the question, "why would a woman choose a nun’s life today?"

Individual interviews with seven women provide answers—and explore how rebellion can happen within and outside the Church, how women in the Church reconcile conflicting, religious, personal, and political beliefs, and how they view official Church positions on contraception, homosexuality, and women's ordination as priests. The diverse group includes Poor Clares, contemplative nuns who spend most of their days in prayer, Maryknolls who have served in Central America, a lesbian former nun, and a Roman Catholic Womanpriest.

The film is distributed by Women Make Movies. It has a running time of 60 minutes.

External links
 

2009 documentary films
Documentary films about women and religion
Documentary films about Catholicism
2009 films
Catholicism and women